Wang Huiqin (born 21 October 1955) is a Chinese-Slovenian artist: painter, calligrapher, book illustrator and author.
 
Wang Huiqin was born in Nantong, China in 1955. She graduated from the department of fine arts at the Nanjing Faculty of Education. In 1983, Wang came to Slovenia where she specialized in graphic arts and painting at the Academy of Fine Arts in Ljubljana. She lives and works in Ljubljana. Her creative medium is visual art and also writing. She collaborates with the Department for Asian and African Studies and with the Arts Faculty of the University of Ljubljana where she teaches calligraphy and Chinese art. In 2000, she became senior university assistant professor for drawing and calligraphy.

She represents an extremely precious addition to Slovenian multiculturalism. She lives the Asian-European experience in her own way, as a sensitive creator that unites ontological experiences of the Western and Eastern painting traditions with the intimate experience of a displaced person-woman. In 2005, Slovenian Times chose her for the cultural personality of the year. She represented Slovenian artists at the entry of Slovenia into the European Union and exhibited in Portugal, Italy, Belgium, Austria and Germany. She has had a lot of exhibitions in Slovenia and China. 
She has illustrated and also written a number of children's books for Slovene publishers, most often tales and stories with Far Eastern references.

In 2008 she has started Ferdinand Avguštin Hallerstein, a big project with a lot of different events, exhibitions and an illustrated book.

Illustrations and books:
Jack London: Klic divjine (The Call of the Wild, ČZP Kmečki glas, Ljubljana 1986)
 (Brocade Image, Tales of Chinese Ethnic Minorities, Mladinska knjiga, Ljubljana 1991) received the Levstik Award for her illustrations of traditional stories
Alenka Auersperger:  (Chinese Notes, Dolenjska založba, Novo mesto 1994)
 (Tales from the Roof of the World, Tibetan Tales, Mladinska kniga, Ljubljana 1995) 
 (The Most Beautiful Fan, Japanese Fairy Tales, Mladinska knjiga, Ljubljana 1996)
Franci Koncilija:  (Pursued Memories, Dolenjska založba, Novo mesto 1998)
 (Calligraphy As an Art, scripta, Beletrina 2010)
Huiqin Wang: Ferdinand Avguštin Hallerstein: . (Ferdinand Augustin Hallerstein: Slovenian in the Forbidden City; Ljubljana: Mladinska knjiga 2014, 31pp) received the Kristina Brenk Award for the best original Slovene picture book in 2014 and the Golden Pear Award for the best children non-fiction book in 2015.
Huiqin Wang: Giuseppe Castiglione: slikar v Prepovedanem mestu. (Giuseppe Castiglione: painter in the Forbidden City; Jezero: Morfemplus 2015, 31pp)
Huiqin Wang: Jaz, Marco Polo. (Me Marco Polo; Ljubljana: Mladinska knjiga 2018, 31pp)

Selected individual exhibitions
Šivec House Art Gallery, Radovljica, Slovenia 1984
Niš Municipal gallery, Niš, Yugoslavia 1986
Jiangsu Province Art Gallery, Nanjing, China 1992
Dolenjska Muzeum, Novo mesto, Slovenia 1993
The Clash of East and West, The ZDSLU Gallery, Ljubljana, Slovenia 1993
The XXOY Gallery, Bruseels, Belgium 1995
The TR3 Gallery, Ljubljana, Slovenia 1997
Scrolls 1990–1997, Domžale Art Gallery, Slovenia 1997
Loža Gallery, Koper, Slovenia 1998
We are Ephemeral – Sonhos Efemeros(with Živko Marušič), Palacio Foz Lisbon, Portugal 1999
Beyond Dreams (with Tomaž Lunder), Nanjing Shenhua Art Centre, China 2004
Impalpable Beings, Cankarjev dom, Ljubljana, Slovenia 2006
Insieme – Skupaj (together with Zora Stančič), A+A gallery, Venice, Italy 2006
Live Calligraphy (with Daisuke Sakaki), Kibla, Maribor, Slovenia 2007
Transfer Beyond Time, Shanghai Archives, China 2008 
Transfer Beyond Time, Slovenian Ethnographic Museum, Ljubljana, Slovenia 2008
Science Meets Art -Hallerstein, Ge Yi Gallery, Nantong, China 2009
Intertwined path, Municipal Gallery Ljubljana, Slovenia 2010
Everything is possible, The White Box Gallery, Beijing 798, China 2011
May or May not (with Marko Mandič), Equrna Gallery, Ljubljana, Slovenia 2012
Icons of Socialism (with z Metod Frlic), Alkatraz Gallery, Ljubljana, Slovenia 2013
Hallerstein, Slovenian in Forbidden City, Slovenian Ethnographic Museum, Ljubljana, Slovenija, 2014
Hallerstein and Silk Road, UNO, Wien, Austria, 2017

Selected awards:

Levstik Award, 1993
Hinko Smrekar Distinction, 1993
Guest Star – Slovenia Times, 2005
Kristina Brenk Award, 2014
The Golden Pear Award, 2015

References

External links
 Wang Huiqin official site
 http://www.fotosay.com/topics/whq/index.html
 http://www.artlinkart.com/en/artist/overview/783bsypp
 http://oldsite.sinologystudy.com/2011/1016/225.php
 http://www.ibby.org/fileadmin/user_upload/european_newsletter_11-18/IBBY_European_Newsletter_November_2018.htm
 

Chinese illustrators
Living people
1955 births
Levstik Award laureates
People's Republic of China calligraphers
Slovenian artists
University of Ljubljana alumni
Academic staff of the University of Ljubljana
Chinese emigrants to Slovenia
Chinese emigrants to Yugoslavia
Educators from Nantong
Women calligraphers
Painters from Nantong